The 2010 Grand Prix SAR La Princesse Lalla Meryem was a women's tennis tournament played on outdoor clay courts. It was the 10th edition of the tournament, and was on the International category of the 2010 WTA Tour. It took place in Fes, Morocco, from 26 April until 1 May 2010. Seventh-seeded Iveta Benešová won the singles title.

Entrants

Seeds

 Rankings as of April 19, 2010.

Other entrants
The following players received wildcards into the main draw:
  Lina Bennani
  Nadia Lalami
  Fatima Zahrae El Allami

The following players received entry from the qualifying draw:
  Gréta Arn
  Claire de Gubernatis
  Simona Halep
  Laura Pous Tió

Finals

Singles

 Iveta Benešová defeated  Simona Halep, 6-4, 6-2
It was Benešová's first title of the year and second of her career.

Doubles

 Iveta Benešová /  Anabel Medina Garrigues defeated  Lucie Hradecká /  Renata Voráčová, 6–3, 6–1

External links
 ITF tournament edition details
 Tournament draws

Grand Prix SAR La Princesse Lalla Meryem
Morocco Open
2010 in Moroccan tennis